Fjellhamar is a village in Akershus, Norway and is about twenty minutes driving from Oslo.

Famous residents
 Jarle Aambø
 Tom Haagen

Villages in Akershus